Monte San Giacomo is a town and comune in the province of Salerno in the Campania region of south-western Italy.

Geography
The municipality borders with Piaggine, Sanza, Sassano and Teggiano.

See also
Pruno Cilento
Cilento
Vallo di Diano

References

External links

 Comune of Monte San Giacomo

Cities and towns in Campania
Localities of Cilento